Progress M-21 was a Russian unmanned Progress cargo spacecraft, which was launched in January 1994 to resupply the Mir space station.

Launch
Progress M-21 launched on 28 January 1994 from the Baikonur Cosmodrome in Kazakhstan. It used a Soyuz-U rocket.

Docking
Progress M-21 docked with the aft port of the Kvant-1 module of Mir on 30 January 1994 at 03:56:13 UTC, and was undocked on 23 March 1994 at 01:20:29 UTC.

Decay
It remained in orbit until 23 March 1994, when it was deorbited. The deorbit burn occurred at 04:23 UTC, and the mission ended at 05:13 UTC.

See also

 1994 in spaceflight
 List of Progress missions
 List of uncrewed spaceflights to Mir

References

Progress (spacecraft) missions
1994 in Kazakhstan
Spacecraft launched in 1994
Spacecraft which reentered in 1994
Spacecraft launched by Soyuz-U rockets